Kumsa Diriba (born 1969/1970), known by his nom de guerre Jaal Marroo, is an Ethiopian military leader who is Commander-in Chief of the Oromo Liberation Army. In August 2021, Diriba announced an alliance against the Government of Ethiopia with the Tigray Defense Forces, stating that he and the OLA wanted to overthrow the government militarily. In November 2021, he claimed to the Agence France-Presse that OLA troops were near the Ethiopian capital of Addis Ababa.

References

1970 births
Oromo politicians
Living people